Catriona Ann Le May Doan,  (born December 23, 1970) is a retired Canadian speed skater and a double Olympic champion in the 500 m and served as the chef de mission for Team Canada at the 2022 Winter Olympics in Beijing.

Career

Speed skating
Born in Saskatoon, Saskatchewan, of Scottish ancestry, Le May Doan won the Olympic 500 m title at the 1998 Winter Olympics in Nagano, Japan and she repeated this feat at the 2002 Winter Olympics in Salt Lake City, Utah, giving rise to the title "the fastest woman on ice". At the Nagano Olympics, she also won a bronze on the 1,000 m. She was World Sprint Champion 1998 and 2002 and World Champion 500 m 1998, 1999, and 2001, and she won a 500 m bronze in 2000. She has also won the 500 m World Cup 4 times (in 1998, 1999, 2001, and 2003) and the 1,000 m World Cup once (in 1998). She has twice been Canada's flag bearer at the Winter Olympics, for the 1998 Nagano Olympics closing ceremony and the opening ceremony of the 2002 Salt Lake City Olympics.

On November 22, 1997, Le May Doan became the first woman to break the 38-second barrier for the 500 m, skating 37.90 s in Calgary, Alberta. Before the year was over, she had tied this record once and broken it twice, ending on 37.55 s. Within the next four years, she broke this record four more times, up to 37.22 s in Calgary, in December 2001. No other woman has set eight consecutive World Records in one distance. Between 7 January 2001 and 24 February 2001, Le May Doan was the only woman under the 38-second barrier, achieving it 14 times, including the eight times that she lowered the overall record.

 1. Catriona Le May-Doan CAN 37,40 1 Calgary 06-01-2001
 2. Catriona Le May-Doan CAN 37,55 1 Calgary 28-12-1997
 3. Catriona Le May-Doan CAN 37,57 1 Calgary 07-01-2001
 4. Catriona Le May-Doan CAN 37,71 1 Calgary 27-03-1998
 5. Catriona Le May-Doan CAN 37,71 1 Calgary 27-12-1997
 6. Catriona Le May-Doan CAN 37,86 1 Calgary 21-02-1999
 7. Catriona Le May-Doan CAN 37,88 1 Calgary 27-03-1998
 8. Catriona Le May-Doan CAN 37,89 1 Calgary 20-02-1999
 9. Catriona Le May-Doan CAN 37,90 1 Calgary 22-11-1997
10. Catriona Le May-Doan CAN 37,90 1 Calgary 23-11-1997
11. Catriona Le May-Doan CAN 37,90 1 Calgary 29-11-1998
12. Catriona Le May-Doan CAN 37,94 1 Calgary 18-11-2000
13. Catriona Le May-Doan CAN 37,97 1 Calgary 12-01-2000
14. Catriona Le May-Doan CAN 37,98 1 Calgary 13-02-1999

Le May Doan still had a long way to go before she started fighting for Olympic Gold and World Records. In the 1994 Winter Olympics, she fell on the 500 m and placed 17th on the 1,500 m as her best result. Prior to the Nagano Games, she was training with her teammate and rival Susan Auch, both being coached by Susan's brother, Derrick Auch. In 1998 Nagano, Susan Auch placed 2nd behind Catriona on the 500 m. Leading up to the 2002 Salt Lake City Games, Le May Doan was coached by the Canadian sprint coach, former Olympic speed skater Sean Ireland.

Le May Doan repeated her gold medal in the 500m at the 2002 Salt Lake City Olympics from the 1998 Nagano Olympics. She became the first Canadian to defend their gold medal at the Olympics.

Le May Doan was married to Bart Doan, they separated in 2017. She has two children, Greta and Easton. In 2002, she published an autobiography, Going for Gold.

After speedskating

Le May Doan retired from competitive skating in 2003, and in 2004 gave birth to her first child, Greta. She was a commentator for the Canadian Broadcasting Corporation during the 2004 Summer Olympics in Athens and was a member of the official Canadian contingent when Vancouver, British Columbia was chosen as the site of the 2010 Winter Olympics. She is a popular motivational speaker, and has been involved with Campus Crusade for Christ's Power to Change campaign.

In 2005, she was made an Officer of the Order of Canada, and inducted into the Canadian Sports Hall of Fame.

She provided colour commentary for the Canadian Broadcasting Corporation during the 2006 Winter Olympics for Speed Skating, and was present to see her former teammates Cindy Klassen and Clara Hughes win their personal and national record achievements. She was inducted into the Canadian Olympic Hall of Fame in 2008 and was also a colour commentator for CTV at the 2010 Winter Olympics in Vancouver for the sport of Speed Skating. She was one of four torchbearers selected to light the interior cauldron in BC Place at the opening ceremonies for the 2010 Winter Olympics. She was subsequently left out of the lighting when one of the arms to light the cauldron failed to rise due to mechanical problems. This was remediated, however, as part of the opening segment of the closing ceremonies when she lit the fourth arm of the cauldron.

In November 2020 it was announced that Le May Doan would be the chef de mission for Team Canada at the 2022 Winter Olympics in Beijing.

Achievements

Personal records

References

Notes

Bibliography

 Eng, Trond. All Time International Championships, Complete Results: 1889 – 2002. Askim, Norway: WSSSA-Skøytenytt, 2002.
 Eng, Trond and Preben Gorud Petersen. World All Time Best 2004/2005 – Ladies. Askim, Norway: WSSSA-Skøytenytt, 2005.
 Le May Doan, Catriona with Ken McGoogan. Going For Gold. Toronto, Ontario, Canada: McClelland & Stewart Publishers, 2002. Autobiography

External links

 Catriona Le May Doan Official Site
 Catriona Le May Doan at SkateResults.com
 United Athletes Magazine Le May Doan's Olympic experience.
 
 Power to Change Site
 
 
 
 

1970 births
Canadian television sportscasters
Canadian people of Scottish descent
Living people
Lou Marsh Trophy winners
Officers of the Order of Canada
Olympic gold medalists for Canada
Olympic speed skaters of Canada
Sportspeople from Saskatoon
Speed skaters from Calgary
Speed skaters at the 1992 Winter Olympics
Speed skaters at the 1994 Winter Olympics
Speed skaters at the 1998 Winter Olympics
Speed skaters at the 2002 Winter Olympics
Olympic medalists in speed skating
Olympic cauldron lighters
World record setters in speed skating
Canadian female speed skaters
Medalists at the 2002 Winter Olympics
Medalists at the 1998 Winter Olympics
Olympic bronze medalists for Canada
Canadian women television personalities